Stuart H. Smith (born September 15, 1960, died May 20, 2022) was a controversial practicing plaintiff attorney licensed in Louisiana. Smith practiced law for more than 25 years, litigating against oil companies and other energy-related corporations for damages associated with radioactive oilfield waste. Smith was one of the lead legal strategists in on-going national litigation regarding the nation's drug-industry manufactured opioid crisis, having led the nation-wide effort to have the crisis’ impact on opioid-dependent born children recognized as a special class deserving of dedicated, long-term response from those who caused the epidemic in the United States.

Biography 
Smith dropped out of school at 15, earning his GED years later. He went on to earn his B.S. from Louisiana State University and his J.D. from Loyola University New Orleans College of Law in 1986.

Smith pledged 1.5 million to Loyola's Law School in 2008  and they renamed their law clinic the Stuart H. Smith Law Clinic and Center for Social Justice.  Smith is married to Mr. Barry Cooper. Smith was suspended from practicing law by the Louisiana State Supreme Court  for a period of 3 months in 2018.

Legal career 
In 1992, Smith litigated against Chevron. Street v. Chevron pitted the family owners of a pipe-yard located in rural southeastern Mississippi against a multinational oil conglomerate. Allegedly, for years, Chevron had sent radioactive oilfield pipe to Street, Inc., for cleaning –– without informing the owners that the pipe contained radioactive material. Investigators from the Mississippi Division of Radiological Health found radiation from radium on the Street property 500 times the natural level. Chevron ultimately settled the case for an undisclosed amount of money in what remains one of the longest-running jury trials in Mississippi history.

In 1994, Smith teamed with Andrew Sacks to form Sacks & Smith, a New Orleans-based plaintiff law firm. Smith and Michael Stag began working together in 1997 and later established the firm SmithStag, focusing on plaintiff-oriented, environmental and toxic tort cases.

In 2001, Smith was lead counsel in an oilfield radiation case that resulted in a verdict of $1.056 billion against ExxonMobil for contaminating private property it leased from the Grefer family in Harvey, Louisiana. ExxonMobil appealed the verdict, securing a reduction in the punitive award, but was still ordered to pay hundreds of millions in damages.

In 2010 Stuart H. Smith registered Louisiana Truth PAC with the Federal Election Commission.  Louisiana Truth PAC attacked then State Representative  Cedric Richmond as he sought to unseat Republican Joseph Cao. A third candidate; State Representative and New Orleans trial lawyer Juan LaFonta appeared to the beneficiary of Louisiana Truth PAC efforts.  Stuart H. Smith contributed 4,800 to Lafonta's campaign. While Smith initially demurred on whether he funded Louisiana Truth PAC Opensecrets.org showed contributions to Louisiana Truth PAC from Smith in excess of 111,000 dollars.  Cedric Richmond went on to win that race and is now the powerful chairman of the Congressional Black Caucus.  Smith continued to fund Louisiana Truth PAC as late as 2017 with a 7,000 contribution.  Interestingly Louisiana Truth PAC paid New Orleans based public relations firm Cheron Brylski 3500.00.  Brylski Group lists multiple Stuart H. Smith centered press releases in its records.

Stuart H. Smith has been a campaign contributor to a litany of Democratic candidates  over the years including Barack Obama, Hillary Clinton, Mary Landrieu and Al Franken and is heavy contributor to the left leaning American Association for Justice PAC whose stated purpose is  "preserving the civil justice system."

He was lead counsel in representing commercial fishermen in 2010, whose livelihoods continue to be devastated by the Deepwater Horizon oil spill in the Gulf of Mexico, and won the second largest verdict against an oil company in 2001 for exposing the cancer-causing soil contamination left behind in Harvey, Louisiana by ExxonMobil. He is also an award-winning preservationist, particularly for his defense of the residential character of the New Orleans French Quarter. He is author of Crude Justice: How I Fought Big Oil and Won.

In 2014, Stuart H. Smith supported a effort by the  Vieux Carré Property Owners, Residents and Associates (VCPORA) to 'eliminate noise' in the French Quarter neighborhood of New Orleans.  This sparked a massive fight between New Orleans preservationists and Smith/VCPORA in which it was revealed that Stuart H. Smith had previously sued 8 beloved French Quarter establishments including Pat O' Briens , Antoine's, and the Court of Two Sisters.  Furthermore, Stuart H. Smith sent threatening emails to Council-member Kristin Gisleson Palmer (District C) when Palmer pushed back on Stuart H. Smith's noise ordinance effort. This culminated in Stuart H. Smith pleading guilty to the charge of cyber-stalking against the Hon. Kristin Gisleson Palmer .

Today, Stuart H. Smith, along with his partner Barry Cooper, is co-founder of the Cooper Law Firm, a New Orleans-based practice of plaintiff attorneys licensed to focus on environmental law, toxic torts, and medical malpractice suits in the U.S. and across the globe.

Mr. Smith, who is recognized internationally as a crusader against major oil companies, polluters associated with radioactive oilfield waste, as well as a champion of individuals whose health has been harmed by the careless practices of corporations, has been lead counsel on more than 100 oil pollution cases, which focus primarily on damages caused by the wastewater and sludge discharged by oil companies into the environment.

Notes

References 
Cox, James (1993). “Naturally Occurring Radioactive Materials in the Oilfield: Changing the NORM”. Tulane Law Review 67(4), 1197-1230.

Digges, Diana (January 7, 2002). “Billion-Dollar Blockbuster Against Oil Industry: Retired Judge Claims Exxon Mobil Contaminated His Land With Radioactive Waste”. Lawyers Weekly USA, pp. 1–4.

Schneider, Keith (December 24, 1990). “2 Suits 2 Suits on Radium Cleanup Test Oil Industry’s Liability”. The New York Times. https://www.nytimes.com/1990/12/24/us/2-suits-on-radium-cleanup-test-oil-industry-s-liability.html?pagewanted=1

Schneider, Keith (December 3, 1990). “Radiation Danger Found in Oilfields Across the Nation”. The New York Times. https://www.nytimes.com/1990/12/03/us/radiation-danger-found-in-oilfields-across-the-nation.html?pagewanted=all

Schneider, Keith (December 26, 1990). “U.S. Wrestles With Gap in Radiation Exposure Rules”. The New York Times, p. A1.

"Street Inc. vs. Chevron." (Winter 1993). The NORM Report, p. 8.

1960 births
Living people